Asante Kotoko Sporting Club, simply known as Asante Kotoko, is a professional football club founded on 31 August 1935 and based in Kumasi in the Ashanti Region of Ghana. Nicknamed the Porcupine Warriors, they compete in the Ghana Premier League and play their home matches at the Baba Yara Stadium in Amakom, Kumasi.

They have won the league a record 24 times and the CAF Champions League twice and were adjudged the African club of the century by the International Federation of Football History and Statistics (IFFHS).

History

Early years 
The foundation of Kumasi Asante Kotoko Sporting Club was laid by 13 young Ashanti men led by a young driver, Mr. Kwasi Kumah, ably supported by L.Y. Asamoah an electrician. Mr. Kwasi Kumah, a native of Nyankyerenease near Kumasi in the Ashanti Region, was a chauffeur to an English man and military officer, a Colonel Ross. Kwasi Kumah nurtured the idea of forming a football team when he watched an exciting football match.
When Colonel Ross returned home for good, Kumah bought a set of jerseys to start his football team. With co-operation from his good friend, L.Y.Asamoah, he formed the Ashanti United Football Club in 1926. Five years later the team was renamed Kumasi Titanics. The team was really handicapped because most of the players worked in government organizations like the Prisons and Railways and had been transferred from Kumasi. "Kumasi Titanics" did not find enough luck in their new name and in 1934 they adopted a more powerful name, Mighty Atoms. Still the club did not see much progress and in 1935, Mr J.S.K. Frimpong, popularly called Teacher Frimpong, then a teacher of the Kumasi Government School who had all the time shown interest in the club, organized some men from his school and proposed a change of name from "Kumasi Titanics" to Kumasi Asante Kotoko Football Club. Permission had to be obtained from the Asantehene (King of the Kingdom of Ashanti) because the name "Kotoko", meaning "Porcupine" is the official symbol of the Ashanti nation. The Asantehene, Nana Sir Osei Agyeman Prempeh II, became the first life patron of the club. Kumasi Asante Kotoko Football Club was subsequently formally founded in 1935.

Asante Kotoko's emblem features the "Porcupine", displaying an inbuilt arsenal of sharp spikes for use when attacked by an enemy.

Tragedy 
The Accra Sport Stadium disaster occurred at the Ohene Djan Stadium, Accra, Ghana on 9 May 2001. Ghana's most successful football teams played that day, the Accra Hearts of Oak (The Phobians) Sporting Club and the Asante Kotoko. Accra had two late goals and a referee would call 2–1 Accra, resulting in disappointed Kotoko fans throwing plastic seats and bottles onto the pitch. The police responded by firing tear gas into the trapped crowd. Panic and a stampede ensued as fans tried to escape. After the hour-long ordeal, it was found that 117 deaths resulted from compressive asphyxia and 10 fans died from trauma.

In January 2020 the team was banned from the Baba Yara stadium temporarily, after violent reactions by their supporters, which led to one of their fans being hit by a rubber bullet that was fired by the police. The fans were seen in various footages, throwing projectiles onto the pitch, because they were displeased with a decision the referee made. This happened in a match that they played against Berekum Chelsea. A GFA ruling, fined the club 20,000 Ghana cedis and the next three games that they would play in the league would be behind closed doors.

2000s 
In July 2011, Asante Kotoko and English Premier League club Sunderland signed a partnership agreement, which will see Sunderland offering practical support and advice in youth coaching, player development, fitness and medical matters as well as football business strategy to Asante Kotoko. In January 2002, P V Obeng was appointed as the board chairman of the Board of Directors of the club.

Colours
The colours of Asante Kotoko depict the colours on both the national flag (ethnic flag) and national emblem of Ashanti with the colours of red, yellow and green used on the Asante Kotoko first (home) kit shirts and shorts while the colours white and red are used on the Asante Kotoko second alternative kit shirts and shorts; and in 2011, Asante Kotoko re-introduced third alternative kit of black, yellow and green colours worn in the late 1980s.

Kits evolution

Emblem

Asante Kotoko's emblem is symbolizes the national emblem of the Kingdom of Ashanti (Kingdom of Asante) and Ashanti with the colours black, green and yellow enclosing the colours on the national flag and ethnic flag of the Kingdom of Asante and Asante Kotoko's emblem [also represents the national emblem of the Ashanti people and the Ashanti nation (who are more like the Catalan people and Catalonia); the Asante Kotoko emblem features a remarkably threatening looking porcupine and the motto "Ashanti ", which means "If you kill a thousand, a thousand more will come".

Ground

Asante Kotoko's home stadium is the Baba Yara Stadium located in the capital city of Ashanti, Kumasi. Champions Asante Kotoko are to get a multi-purpose stadium called the Rlg Fabulous Arena based on a three-year endorsement contract with Rlg Communications. Rlg, became Asante Kotoko's eleventh endorser since Asante Kotoko's executive board chairman Dr K.K Sarpong took office in the middle of 2010. The Asante Kotoko executive board committee reached a perfect agreement with endorser Rlg Communications to build a mega new stadium for Asante Kotoko in a yet-to-be determined location within the capital city of the Ashanti nation, Kumasi. The Asante Kotoko stadium project which by the end of its construction will be named the Rlg Fabulous Arena will likely begin to take course in the final year of the Asante Kotoko and Rlg Communications contract.

Support
Asante Kotoko is the 6th biggest football team and professional club in Continental Africa and arguably the biggest club in Ghana; Asante Kotoko has a speculated ten million (10,000,000) followers and in the year 2011, Asante Kotoko and Sunderland AFC respective club executive Chairmen's engaged in strategic and positive discussions on both clubs collaborating. The Asante Kotoko strategical partnership sees Sunderland of the Premier League sharing its coaching and business expertise with Asante Kotoko, offering practical support and advice in youth coaching, player development, fitness and medical matters and football business strategy. Kotoko in turn works closely with Sunderland AFC to help the Premier League club build and grow its brand in the emerging African territory and geographic Africa.

Ownership

Club financing and club endorsements
The owner and life patron of Asante Kotoko sports club is the Asantehene, King of the Ashantis/ Asantes of Ghana, Osei Tutu II. The GH150 million per annum (per season) Asante Kotoko squad players salary wage bill for 2015 and further additional GH105 million per annum (per season) squad players transfer wage bill for 2015 is financed from the large and industrial mineral rich economy of Ashanti with Ashanti being the 2nd largest producer of theobroma cacao and cocoa in the world as most of the world's cocoa is grown in Ashanti. Ashanti is a top-10 producer of gold bars and gold bullions in the world as Ashanti is also a major site of the world's gold-mining industry with Ashanti being home to the world's 10th largest producing gold mine on Earth; The Obuasi Gold Mine. The 1 ton of Gold bars and Gold (Bullion) is worth $64.3 Million dollars (US$64,300,000) at $2000/oz.

Asante Kotoko's diverse endorsements portfolio includes technology corporations Interplast, Smart TV, Iei and giant Rlg Communications; financial institution Fidelity Bank; water company Everpure limited, Peppis Pizza limited, and Vit's Noodles limited; telecommunication companies Millicom and MTN Group; mass media company SportsPro Media limited; worldwide major electricity generation and electricity construction incorporation Symbion Power; and Singaporean kit manufacturer Kubba.

Partnerships 
In November 2020 a partnership agreement was signed between the club and Hisense Ghana. This made Hisense, an electronics manufacturer, the club's official electronics partner from 2020 until 2023.

Sponsorship

Training facility

Asante Kotoko Adako-Jachie Training Complex

Asante Kotoko training ground and training facilities headquarters, are located in the capital city of the Ashanti nation, Kumasi. There is ongoing construction of the "Asante Kotoko Adako-Jachie Training Complex" which when completed in 2015 will consist of three training pitches, one artificial grass pitch, multi-functional sports hall, Olympic-size swimming pool and a 20-bedroom camping facility for Asante Kotoko at Adako Jachie suburb situated on the outskirts of Kumasi. The "Asante Kotoko Adako-Jachie Training Complex"; three training pitches and the 20 bedroom facility will come with a large multi-operational health club and gym, weights for strength training and physical fitness area, a massage unit, dressing rooms, the technical staff's and coaches' office, as well as a conference room with screening facilities and offices for the Asante Kotoko Chief operating officers (Operations Director) and the technical bench.

Whereas one of the training pitches will go to the Asante Kotoko reserve and youth squad; the remaining two other training pitches will be used by the Asante Kotoko professional senior squad.
The Asante Kotoko executive board committee revealed that 10 percent of contributions to the Asante Kotoko development project fund would be used to fund the "Asante Kotoko Adako-Jachie Training Complex" and mega training facility. The Asante Kotoko executive board intimated that the Asante Kotoko Owner and Life Patron of Asante Kotoko, Asantehene King Otumfuo Osei Tutu II of the Ashanti nation is to provide both financial and moral support to the "Asante Kotoko Adako-Jachie Training Complex" and mega training facility construction project. The Asante Kotoko squad players are driven from the Asante Kotoko stadium on the Asante Kotoko squad coach (bus) manufactured by Tata Motors of conglomerate Tata Group to the training headquarters of Asante Kotoko.

Situated at the headquarters of Asante Kotoko is also the Youth academy of Asante Kotoko, in which system and program focuses on the Asante Kotoko youth squad players development as footballers. Former products of the Asante Kotoko Youth academy development program and system include Karim Abdul Razak, Tony Yeboah, Isaac Vorsah, Samuel Inkoom, Godwin Antwi.

Current squad

Honours

National Titles
 Ghana Premier League: 24
 1959, 1963–64, 1964–65, 1967-68, 1969, 1972, 1975, 1980, 1981, 1982, 1983, 1985-86,1987, 1988–89, 1990–91, 1991–92, 1992–93, 2003, 2005, 2007–08, 2011–12, 2012–13, 2013–14, 2021–22 (record)

GFA Normalization Committee Special Competition: 1
 2019

 FA Cup: 9
 1958, 1959, 1960, 1978, 1984, 1997–98, 2001, 2014, 2017
 Ghana Super Cup: 3
 2012, 2013, 2014 (joint record)

Other GFA National Titles
 SWAG Cup: 16
 1981, 1988, 1989, 1990, 1991, 1992, 1993, 1998 (shared), 2001, 2003, 2005, 2008
 Ghana Telecom Gala: 3
 1999–2000, 2001, 2005 (record)
 Ghana Top Four Cup: 3
 2003, 2007 (record)
 President's Cup: 8
 1973, 1984, 2004, 2005, 2008, 2016, 2017, 2019 (record)

 GHALCA Special Cup: 3
 Ghana Top Eight Cup: 3
 Ghana Top Six Cup: 2
 Independence Cup: 3
 June 4 Cup: 1
 31 December Revolution Cup: 2

International Titles
 African Cup of Champions Clubs/CAF Champions League: 2
Champions: 1970, 1983

Performance in CAF competitions

 CAF Champions League: 10 appearances

2004 – Third Round
2005 – First Round
2006 – Group Stage
2007 – Preliminary Round

2009 – First Round
2010 – Preliminary Round
2013 – First Round

2014 – Preliminary Round
2015 – First Round
2019–20 – First Round

 African Cup of Champions Clubs: 16 appearances

1966: Quarter-finals
1967: Finalist
1969: Semi-finals
1970: Champion
1971: Finalist
1973: Finalist

1976: Quarter-finals
1981: Second Round
1982: Finalist
1983: Champion
1984: First Round
1987: Semi-finals

1988: First Round
1990: Semi-final
1992: Quarter-finals
1993: Finalist

 CAF Confederation Cup: 6 appearances
1995 – Quarter-finals
1997 – Second Round
2004 – Finalist
2008 – Group Stage
2019 – Group Stage
2020 – Playoffs round
 2CAF Cup Winners' Cup: 7 appearances

1979 – First Round
1985 – Quarter-Finals
1991 – First Round

1999 – Second Round
2002 – Finalist

2003 – Quarter-Finals
2005 – First Round

Former footballers
For details on former Asante Kotoko SC footballers see :Category:Asante Kotoko S.C. players.

Club captains 

 Abdoulaye Soulama (2008–10)
 Jordan Opoku (2010–11)
 Amos Frimpong (2015–2019)
 Felix Annan (2019–2021)
Ismail Abdul-Ganiyu (2021–2022)

Head coaches
  George Commey Mills-Odoi (1951–1952)
  Tamás Kertész (1971–1973)
 Ibrahim Sunday (1982)
 Malik Jabir (1993–1994)
 James Kwesi Appiah (1995–1996)
 Ernst Middendorp (30 December 1999 – 30 June 2002)
 Karim Abdul Razak (2003–2004)
 Malik Jabir (2005–2006)
  Telat Üzüm (1 October 2006 – 31 March 2007)
  Maurice Cooreman (1 November 2008 – 10 February 2009)
  Herbert Addo (25 June 2009 – 1 April 2010)
  Bogdan Korak (5 November 2010 – 26 August 2011)
  Maxwell Konadu (2011–12)
  Dramani Mas-Ud Didi (2012–14)
  David Duncan (2014–16)
  Michael Osei (2016)
  Zdravko Logarušić(2017)
  Steven Polack (May, 2017)
   Paa Kwesi Fabin (2018)
   Charles Akonnor(1 Oct 2018 – July 2019)
   Kjetil Zachariassen (July 2019 –  December 2019)
 Maxwell Konadu ( December 2019 – December 2020)
 Abdul Gazale (February 2021 – March 2021) (Interim)
 Mariano Barreto(March 2021 – September 2021)
 Prosper Narteh Ogum(September 2021 – August 2022)

Seasons 
 2020–21 Asante Kotoko S.C. season
 2022–23 Asante Kotoko S.C. season

References

Notes

External links
 Official website
 Asante Kotoko Forum
 

 
Ashanti people
Ashanti monarchy
Ashanti Region
Kumasi
1935 establishments in Gold Coast (British colony)
Football clubs in Ghana
Sports clubs in Ghana
Association football clubs established in 1935
CAF Champions League winning clubs